The Netherlands Football League Championship 1890–1891 was contested by five teams from the cities Amsterdam, The Hague, Haarlem and Rotterdam. The teams participated in the competition that would later be called Eerste Klasse West. But since the western football district of the Netherlands was the only one to have a competition at the time, it could be regarded as a national championship, making it the first proper football league in Continental Europe. HVV Den Haag from The Hague won the championship, it was considered to be the first official one, since it was the first season in which all teams played an equal number of matches.

League standings

Results

References
RSSSF Eerste Klasse West
RSSSF Netherlands Football League Championships 1898-1954

Netherlands Football League Championship seasons